The 1907 Tour de France was the fifth running of the annual Tour de France, one of cycling's Grand Tours. From 8 July to 4 August, the 93 cyclists cycled 4488 km (2,788 mi) in fourteen stages around France. The winner, Lucien Petit-Breton, completed the race at an average speed of 28.47 km/h (17.69 mi/h). For the first time, climbs in the Western Alps were included in the Tour de France. The race was dominated at the start by Émile Georget, who won five of the first eight stages. In the ninth stage, he borrowed a bicycle from a befriended rider after his own broke. This was against the rules; initially he received only a small penalty and his main competitors left the race out of protest. Georget's penalty was then increased and Lucien Petit-Breton became the new leader. Petit-Breton won two of the remaining stages and the overall victory of the Tour.

Innovations and changes
The 1907 Tour de France incorporated 14 stages, which was one more than in 1906. For the first time, roads in Switzerland were included. The mountain stages in 1906 had been so successful, according to the organiser Henri Desgrange, that the western Alps were included in the race for the first time.

The 1907 race was also the first time that a car with bicycle repairmen drove behind the riders, to give assistance in solving mechanical problems on bicycles.

As in 1906, the race was decided by a points system. At the end of every stage, the winner was given one point, the next cyclist two points, and so on. After the eighth stage, when there were only 49 cyclists left in the race, the points given in the first eight stages were redistributed among the remaining cyclists, according to their positions in those stages.

Participants

René Pottier, the winner of the 1906 Tour de France, did not defend his title because he had committed suicide in early 1907. Although the riders officially rode the Tour as individuals, some shared the same sponsor and cooperated as if they rode in teams. At the start of the race, it was expected that the riders sponsored by Alcyon and the riders sponsored by Peugeot would compete for the overall victory. Alcyon started with three main contenders: Louis Trousselier, Marcel Cadolle and Léon Georget; Peugeot counted on Emile Georget.

As in the previous years, there were two classes of cyclists, the coureurs de vitesse and the coureurs sur machines poinçonnées. Of the 93 cyclists starting the race, 82 were in the poinçonnée category, which meant that they had to finish the race on the same bicycle as they left, and if it was broken they had to fix it without assistance. The coureurs de vitesse could get help from the car with bicycle repairmen when they had to fix a bicycle, and when a bicycle was beyond repair, they could change it to a new one.

Not all cyclists were competing for the victory; some only joined as tourists. The most notable of them was Henri Pépin. Pépin had hired two riders, Jean Dargassies and Henri Gauban, to ride with him. They treated the race as a pleasure ride, stopping for lunch when they chose and spending the night in the best hotels they could find. Dargassies and Gaubin became the first cyclists in the history of the Tour de France to ride not for their own placings but for another rider's interest. During the race, they found another Tour de France competitor, Jean-Marie Teychenne, lying in a ditch. They helped him get up and fed him; from then on Teychenne also helped Pépin.

Race overview

Early in the race, Trousselier, François Faber and Emile Georget were the main contenders. Trousselier, winner of the 1905 Tour de France and eager to win again, won the first stage. In the second stage, the Tour passed the French-German border to finish in Metz, which was then part of Germany. The German authorities allowed the cyclists to finish there, but did not allow the French flag to be flown or the cars of race officials to enter the city. At the end of the stage, Emile Georget seemingly beat Trousselier with a very small margin. After inquiry, Desgrange, the Tour's organiser, decided to put both cyclists in first place, to keep both sponsors satisfied.

In the third stage, the Tour returned to France; at the border, the riders were stopped by two French customs officers and the delay took so long that the stage had to be restarted. During the stage in the Alps, Émile Georget was better than his competitors; he won the stage and became leader of the general classification. Georget won five of the first eight stages, and had a commanding lead. In the seventh stage, Marcel Cadolle, at that time in second place, fell and his handlebar penetrated his knee, after which he had to give up.

During the ninth stage, when Georget was leading the race, he broke the frame of his bicycle at a checkpoint. According to the rules, Georget should have fixed his bicycle alone; he knew this would take him more than five hours, so he switched bicycles with Pierre-Gonzague Privat. This was against the rules, so Georget was given a fine of 500 francs. After this stage, won by Petit-Breton, the general classification was as follows:

Unsatisfied with the fine given to Georget, Trousselier and the other riders sponsored by Alcyon left the Tour in protest.

After the tenth stage, the organisers gave Georget an additional penalty for the bicycle change in the ninth stage. They changed the classification of the ninth stage, moving Georget from 4th on the stage to last (48th place). This effectively cost him 44 points in the general classification and moved him from first to third place. The new classification, after the tenth stage, was

Lucien Petit-Breton became the new leader of the race. Although he had already finished in fifth place and fourth place in previous years, he was still relatively unknown, and had started in the coureurs sur machines poinçonnées category. Petit-Breton finished in the top three in the next stages, so no other cyclist was able to challenge him for the overall victory. At the end of the race, he had increased his lead to a margin of 19 points ahead of Garrigou and 27 points ahead of Georget.

Results

Stage results

In the first and final stages, the cyclists were allowed to have pacers.

General classification

Although 110 riders were on the starting list, 17 did not show up, so the race started with 93 cyclists. At the end of the Tour de France, 33 cyclists remained.
The cyclists officially were not grouped in teams; some cyclists had the same sponsor, even though they were not allowed to work together.

The total prize money was 25000 French francs, of which 4000 francs were given to Petit-Breton for winning the Tour. In total, he received more than 7000 francs.

Other classifications
Lucien Petit-Breton was also the winner of the "machines poinçonnées" category.

The organising newspaper l'Auto named Emile Georget the meilleur grimpeur. This unofficial title is the precursor to the modern-day mountains classification.

Aftermath
Petit-Breton also started the 1908 Tour de France. He won five stages and the general classification, and became the first cyclist to win the Tour de France two times.

Notes

References

Bibliography

External links

 
Tour de France
Tour de France by year
Tour de France
Tour de France
Tour de France
Tour de France